Cladocora is a genus of corals in the order of stony corals.

Species
Species in this genus include:
 Cladocora arbuscula (Le Sueur, 1821)
 Cladocora caespitosa (Linnaeus, 1767)
 Cladocora debilis Milne Edwards & Haime, 1849
 Cladocora pacifica Cairns, 1991

References

Scleractinia
Scleractinia genera
Taxa named by Christian Gottfried Ehrenberg